Yvonne "Vee" Parker is a character in the Netflix series Orange Is the New Black, played by Lorraine Toussaint. The central antagonist of the second season, Vee is shown to exhibit sociopathic traits, being skilled at manipulation and emotional mimicry. Upon being incarcerated and returning to Litchfield Penitentiary, she works to further promote the race-based tribalistic system of the prison by uniting most of the black women into a gang under her leadership, maintaining power through coercive tactics and physical intimidation inflicted onto the other inmates. Vee is also highly intelligent and resourceful, successfully creating a black market for cigarettes and drugs without being caught by the guards of the penitentiary.

For her critically-acclaimed performance, Toussaint was successfully nominated for multiple awards in both the comedy and drama categories.

Casting and background
Lorraine Toussaint was cast as Vee by the director of the series, Jenji Kohan. Upon hearing from her manager that the cast of Orange Is the New Black had an open position, Toussaint's manager "put [her] on tape and [...] sent it off to New York. They responded very quickly, and liked it." Toussaint did not meet Kohan until the first day on set, and was unaware of Vee's extreme amorality until being informed by him.

Vee has been described as a sociopath that is unafraid to throw others under the bus to maintain control and avoid punishment. Little from Vee's childhood is known, though prior to incarceration she ran a drug ring by employing orphans that were yet to be adopted. Toussaint commented on Vee's perceived motherhood; "[s]he has a capacity to eat her young. But she's [sic] see herself as a mother nonetheless." One reviewer observed "[f]rom the start of Season Two it was clear that Vee had a powerful presence at Litchfield — one that enabled her to control prisoners and leave her nemesis struggling to overcome her." Through her charisma and deception, Vee was able to gain a following during each of her sentences in Litchfield and extend control over most of the inmates. However, Vee's relationship with her former adoptive daughter Tasha "Taystee" Jefferson has been viewed as loving to a degree rather than completely transactional. When asked about the nature of their connection, Toussaint said "Taystee, more than anyone probably in [Vee's] life, has accessed as much heart as she has available to be accessed."

Storylines

Season 2
Vee is first seen in a flashback; Taystee, known then by her birth name Tasha, is seen at an adoption festival trying to find a guardian to take her in, and meets Vee. As a result, Tasha is taken in by Vee and at some point begins to deal drugs for the latter.

Vee appears in real time in Litchfield Penitentiary, being incarcerated once again. Taystee is initially unhappy to see Parker and unwilling to reconcile, though Parker warmly embraces with Galina "Red" Reznikov, who she knew from her prior time in the prison. Noticing that Suzanne Warren is an outsider among her friends and most other inmates, Vee befriends her in order to begin regaining power over the prison. Additionally, Vee tries to convince Poussey Washington to sell her hooch to other inmates for profit, but Poussey refuses.

Having become influential enough among many of the African-American inmates of Litchfield Penitentiary enough to become leader of their group, Vee starts to expand the scope of power of the posse. She has a confrontation with Gloria Mendoza, leader of the Latina posse, feigning fear in order to manipulate Mendoza into accepting a deal. Red, however, recognizes Vee's tactics and becomes increasingly wary of her as a result.

Despite her de facto status as prison matriarch, Poussey refuses to affiliate with Vee's posse, seeing through Vee's charisma. When Vee gets Taystee transferred from her job as librarian in order to assist in Vee's covert cigarette operation, Poussey threatens Vee. Vee, who noticed a kiss between Poussey and Taystee that was not emotionally reciprocated by the latter, shot back that Taystee will never love Poussey, increasing the tension between the two. Vee begins to form a cigarette black market with the help of her posse, who spread word of it and thus increases Vee's influence, convincing Poussey to join her operation and rebuffing Cindy "Black Cindy" Hayes' criticism of her regime.

Vee starts to undermine Red – the other prison matriarch and head of the Caucasian posse – and her perceived alliance with Mendoza. As Red was also running a black market for contraband items, Vee wished to find and utilize Red's source for importing the goods – a secret tunnel in the greenhouse that leads outside of prison grounds –, and threatens Red's family lest she refuses to cooperate. In a further attempt to disempower Red and expand her empire, Vee provides Nicky Nichols, a close friend of Red, with heroin to try and provoke her addiction. Additionally, Vee provides Carrie "Big Boo" Black with cigarettes in exchange for Boo revealing how Red has been bringing in contraband. In a flashback, it is revealed that Red first arrived to Litchfield Penitentiary when Vee was serving one of her prior sentences. Vee befriended Red, and suggested she use her connection to the prison vendor to smuggle in goods, and later shows Vee the fruits of her efforts. Vee, who was the head of the African-American posse at the time, later forcefully acquired the contraband earned by Red and ordered her associates to brutally beat Red up, warning Red that she would end up in maximum security if she reports Vee.

Poussey begins to notice Vee's manipulative self-serving tendencies more clearly and argues with Taystee about it. Much to Poussey's chagrin, Vee displays no reaction when Janae Watson is found with Vee's cigarettes and consequently sent to the Security Housing Unit. Subsequently, Poussey attacks Vee out of rage for allowing Janae to be punished. With Vee's approval, Suzanne interferes and beats up a sobbing Poussey. Meanwhile, some of the elder inmates that have loyalty to Red plan to assassinate Vee independent of the former. The murder is carried out by Erica Taslitz, who is seen stabbing a black woman that she mistakenly thought was Vee, who watches, interpreting the murder as an act of war on Red's part.

Marked hostility and tension between the African-American and Caucasian posses ensues, emphasised by both Vee and Red. When Poussey is discovered to have sabotaged Vee's contraband hiding spots, Vee exiles Taystee from her group. During a verbal confrontation between Vee and Red, the latter attempts to convince the former that the unintended murder of the woman mistaken for Vee was intentional. Later on, while Vee is busy emptying buckets of toilet water due to the prison flooding, Red jumps Vee, choking her with plastic wrap. Despite initially resisting, Vee concedes deafeat, causing Red to release her and the two making a truce. The next day, Vee hits Red over the head with a slock, revealing that the truce was a sham to let Red's guard down.

Due to Vee's assault of Red, the latter is hospitalized and Special Intelligence Service (SIS) arrives at Litchfield to investigate the incident. Vee gaslights Suzanne into believing that she slocked Red, and convinces the rest of her posse to name Suzanne as the culprit as well. SIS concludes that Suzanne was responsible, but prison guard Sam Healy believes in Suzanne's innocence and forges a work order that would have placed Suzanne away from the greenhouse where Red was assaulted. Additionally, Black Cindy and Janae turn against Vee and revise their statement to incriminate Vee. Having no supporters left and sensing her impending doom, Vee denounces her former followers and uses Red's greenhouse tunnel to escape the prison. After a while, Vee reaches the roadside, presumably hoping to hitch-hike. Miss Rosa, another inmate at Litchfield Penitentiary, happened to have escaped in one of the prison's vans at the same time. Remembering that Vee forced Rosa out of her seat in the cafeteria previously, Rosa intentionally veers off the road and runs into Vee, killing her.

Season 3
In the aftermath of Vee's death, Suzanne struggles to accept reality due to having felt a close bond to Vee despite her actions. Suzanne later apologizes to Poussey for having assaulted her under Vee's command.

Season 7
Though she does not appear nor is she explicitly mentioned, when Badison jokingly says to her gang "that's my Taystee girl," when referring to Taystee – a phrase that Vee coincidentally also used –, Taystee is reminded of her experiences with Vee and proceeds to beat Badison up.

Reception

Critical commentary
The character of Yvonne Parker, more commonly known as "Vee" in the series, received praise as an effective and investing villain for the second season. Many viewers felt that the character "brought a charisma to her villainous role that has never quite been mirrored by another." The Hollywood Reporter ranked Vee as the best villain in the series, maintaining that she had "the largest impact on Litchfield and its inmates." In a less positive review, Taran Bassi of Metro News criticized the character for taking advantage of children to deal drugs and Suzanne to do her bidding.

Toussaint's acting in particular was universally acclaimed. An article on The Daily Beast says, "[Vee is] like the monster under the bed, only I loved [Toussaint's] performance so much that I perversely kept crawling under the bed to visit with the monster." Co-star Yael Stone, who plays Lorna Morello in the show, noted "it was a wonderful thing to watch her work, I think she's really incredible."

Awards and nominations

Notes

References 

Female characters in television
Television characters introduced in 2014
Fictional characters introduced in the 2010s
Fictional murderers
Fictional prison escapees
Orange Is the New Black characters
Fictional inmates in American federal prisons
Fictional drug dealers
Fictional African-American people